The 2017 Dutch Darts Masters was the ninth of twelve PDC European Tour events on the 2017 PDC Pro Tour. The tournament took place at MECC Maastricht, Maastricht, Netherlands, between 1–3 September 2017. It featured a field of 48 players and £135,000 in prize money, with £25,000 going to the winner.

Michael van Gerwen was the defending champion after defeating Daryl Gurney 6–2 in the final of the 2016 tournament, and he retained his title for the 4th consecutive year by defeating Steve Beaton 6–1 in the final.

More than half of all seeds (nine out of 16) did lose their first match, thus resulting in the most seeds crashed out in a European Tour Event after the second round (since the adaption of 16 seeds in the second round in 2014) till the 2019 Czech Darts Open which then saw 11 out of 16 seeds lost in their opening match.

Prize money 
This is how the prize money is divided:

Qualification and format 
The top 16 entrants from the PDC ProTour Order of Merit on 30 June automatically qualified for the event and were seeded in the second round.

The remaining 32 places went to players from five qualifying events – 18 from the UK Qualifier (held in Barnsley on 7 July), eight from the West/South European Qualifier (held on 31 August), four from the Host Nation Qualifier (held on 31 August), one from the Nordic & Baltic Qualifier (held on 19 May) and one from the East European Qualifier (held on 25 August).

The following players took part in the tournament:

Top 16
  Michael van Gerwen (winner)
  Peter Wright (semi-finals)
  Mensur Suljović (second round)
  Simon Whitlock (third round)
  Michael Smith (semi-finals)
  Ian White (second round)
  Kim Huybrechts (second round)
  Benito van de Pas (second round)
  Daryl Gurney (quarter-finals)
  Jelle Klaasen (second round)
  Alan Norris (second round)
  Joe Cullen (third round)
  Cristo Reyes (second round)
  Gerwyn Price (second round)
  Rob Cross (third round)
  Mervyn King (second round)

UK Qualifier
  Nathan Aspinall (third round)
  Steve Beaton (runner-up)
  James Wilson (first round)
  Steve West (second round)
  Kyle Anderson (third round)
  Jim Walker (second round)
  Darren Webster (first round)
  John Henderson (quarter-finals)
  Kirk Shepherd (second round)
  Harry Robinson (first round)
  Justin Pipe (first round)
  Chris Quantock (first round)
  Jamie Bain (first round)
  Ryan Searle (first round)
  Jamie Lewis (second round)
  Robert Owen (quarter-finals)
  Steve Lennon (first round)
  Richard North (first round)

West/South European Qualifier
  René Berndt (first round)
  Max Hopp (first round)
  Nico Blum (first round)
  Mike De Decker (third round)
  Martin Schindler (third round)
  Ronny Huybrechts (first round)
  Rowby-John Rodriguez (second round)
  John Michael (first round)

Host Nation Qualifier
  Jimmy Hendriks (second round)
  Christian Kist (third round)
  Justin van Tergouw (first round)
  Jeffrey de Zwaan (second round)

Nordic & Baltic Qualifier
  Ulf Ceder (first round)

East European Qualifier
  Krzysztof Ratajski (quarter-finals)

Draw

References 

2017 PDC European Tour
2017 in Dutch sport